Hora Uncle is an upcoming Sri Lankan Sinhalese children's film of debut direction by Harshana Wickramasinghe and Produced by Suminda Lowe & Saman Dharmawansha. It stars Mahendra Perera and Dulani Anuradha in lead roles along with Janaka Kumbukage and Kumara Thirimadura. Music composed by Nawarathna Gamage.

Plot

Cast
 Mahendra Perera as Bothal Sira
 Dulani Anuradha
 Janaka Kumbukage
 Kumara Thirimadura
 Umayangana Wickramasinghe
 Anuruddhika Padukkage
 Rayan Wandabol
 Rajasinge Loluwagoda
 Ashika Mathasinghe
 Kulasiri Malliakarachchi
 Nethpriya Manubashitha
 Dewmi Sathishka
 Senulya Danthanarayana
 Sampath Hewapelandage
 Upul Gunawardane
 Jayarathna Galagedara
 Saman Dharmawansha

References

Sinhala-language films